The Asia/Oceania Zone was one of the three zones of the regional Davis Cup competition in 2000.

In the Asia/Oceania Zone there were four different tiers, called groups, in which teams competed against each other to advance to the upper tier.

Group I

Winners in Group I advanced to the World Group Qualifying Round, along with losing teams from the World Group first round. Teams who lost their respective ties competed in the relegation play-offs, with winning teams remaining in Group I, whereas teams who lost their play-offs were relegated to the Asia/Oceania Zone Group II in 2001.

Participating nations

Draw

Group II

Winners in Group II advanced to the Asia/Oceania Zone Group I. Teams who lost their respective ties competed in the relegation play-offs, with winning teams remaining in Group II, whereas teams who lost their play-offs were relegated to the Asia/Oceania Zone Group III in 2001.

Participating nations

Draw

Group III

The top two teams in Group III advanced to the Asia/Oceania Zone Group II in 2001, whereas the bottom two teams were relegated to the Asia/Oceania Zone Group IV in 2001.

Participating nations

Draw

Final standings

  and  promoted to Group II in 2001.
  and  relegated to Group IV in 2001.

Group IV

The top two teams in Group IV advanced to the Asia/Oceania Zone Group III in 2001. All other teams remained in Group IV.

Participating nations

Draw

References

External links
Davis Cup official website

 
Davis Cup Asia/Oceania Zone
Asia Oceania Zone